This article lists notable achievements of women, ethnic minorities, people with disabilities, and gay/lesbian/bisexual and transgender people in Canadian politics and elections in Canada.

This list includes:
 Members of Parliament—Members of the House of Commons of Canada;
 Senators—Members of the Senate of Canada
 Governor-general—Canadian Governors General and Lieutenant Governors
 Members of the Legislative Assembly (MLAs);
 Members of Provincial Parliament (MPPs in Ontario);
 Members of the National Assembly (MNAs) in Quebec; and
 Members of the House of Assembly (MHAs) in Newfoundland and Labrador.

Women
First female elected in Canada:
 Maria Grant is the first woman in Canada to be elected to any office, in 1895. She served six years on the Victoria School Board and was presented to the future George V as the only woman elected as a school trustee in Canada.
First female candidate in provincial election in Canada:
 Margaret Haile ran as a candidate of the Canadian Socialist League in Toronto North for the 1902 Ontario provincial election, becoming the first woman ever to stand in a provincial election. She herself was not allowed to vote in the election.
Earliest elected woman in Canada (first woman in Canada elected at the federal, provincial or municipal level):
Hannah Gale, Alderman in Calgary, 1917. (This was the first city election in Canada where a proportional representation electoral system (Single transferable voting) was used.)
First woman elected to a legislature in Canada:
 Louise McKinney, first woman elected to a legislature anywhere in the British Empire, member 1917–1921 of the Legislative Assembly of Alberta for the Non Partisan League, a left-wing prohibitionist socialist party. (Roberta MacAdams, a member of the Canadian Army Medical Corps, was also elected in the 1917 Alberta general election, as a member at large in overseas voting by Albertans serving in the First World War. McKinney was the first woman declared elected because the overseas voting was completed after the in-province election.)

First two women serving at the same time in a legislature anywhere in Canada:
Alberta MLAs Louise McKinney and Roberta McAdams, served 1917 to 1921
First woman candidates in a federal election. 
 Five women ran in the first federal election in which women were allowed to become candidates (1921). (Note: Some women had been granted the right to vote, but not to run as candidates, in the wartime election of 1917. Even in 1921, still many women were denied the right to vote - status Indians, those on the Indian Register, did not get the right to vote in federal elections until 1960.)
 Harriet S. Dick, Winnipeg Centre, Independent; 2,314 (4th Place, 4/5)
 Rose Mary Louise Henderson, St. Lawrence—St. George, Labour Party; 510 (Last Place, 3/3)
 Elizabeth Bethune Kiely, Toronto East, Liberal; 52 votes (Last Place, 5/5)
 Agnes Macphail, Grey Southeast, Progressive Party; 6,958 (1st; 1/3)
 Harriet Dunlop Prenter, Toronto West, Labour Party; 1,741 (Last Place, 3/3)
First women elected to the Canadian House of Commons:
 Agnes Macphail, Progressive, United Farmers of Ontario, Labour, Co-operative Commonwealth Federation (CCF) MP Grey South and Grey—Bruce, from 1921 to 1940. She was also one of two women who were the first women as MPPs in the Legislative Assembly of Ontario for the Ontario CCF (the forerunner to the New Democratic Party) for the riding of York East 1943–1945 and 1948–1951
 Martha Black, Independent Conservative, MP Yukon, 1935–1940
 Dorise Nielsen, Unity (Communist) and Labor-Progressive (Communist) MP North Battleford, Saskatchewan 1940–1945
 Cora Taylor Casselman, teacher, Liberal MP, Edmonton East, 1941–1945
 Gladys Strum, teacher, CCF MP Qu'Appelle, Saskatchewan, 1945–1949
First woman to run in for a federal seat in Quebec:
 Idola Saint-Jean ran as Independent-Liberal candidate in 1930.
First female prime minister:
 Kim Campbell, Progressive Conservative Prime Minister 1993

First women in cabinet
Provincial and Territorial:
Mary Ellen Smith, 1921, British Columbia, Independent Liberal
Irene Parlby, 1921, Alberta, United Farmers of Alberta
Marie-Claire Kirkland 1962, Quebec, Liberal
Thelma Forbes, 1966, Manitoba, Progressive Conservative
Hilda Watson, 1970, Yukon, Consensus government in Canada
Brenda Robertson, 1970, New Brunswick, Progressive Conservative
Margaret Birch, 1972, Ontario, Progressive Conservative
Jean Canfield, 1972, Prince Edward Island, Liberal
Hazel Newhook and Lynn Verge, Newfoundland and Labrador, Progressive Conservative
Joan Duncan and Patricia Anne Smith, 1982, Saskatchewan, Progressive Conservative
Nellie Cournoyea, 1984, Northwest Territories, consensus government
Maxine Cochran, 1985, Nova Scotia, Progressive Conservative
Manitok Thompson, 1999, Nunavut, consensus government
 Federal:
Ellen Fairclough, 1957, Progressive Conservative
Associate Minister of National Defence: Mary Collins
First female cabinetmember with a portfolio: Tilly Rolston
First female Speaker of the Canadian House of Commons:
Jeanne Sauvé, 1980–1984
First female federal Justice Minister (Attorney General):
Kim Campbell (Progressive Conservative)
First female Defence Minister:
 Kim Campbell, (Progressive Conservative)
First female Minister of Finance:
 Chrystia Freeland, (Liberal)
First female Speaker of the House
 Nancy Hodges British Columbia Liberal, MLA 1941–1953, made speaker of British Columbia legislature in December 1949.
First female senator:
Cairine Wilson, 1930
First female Governor General of Canada:
 Jeanne Sauvé, (1984–1990)
First female premiers
Rita Johnston, British Columbia, 1991 (Social Credit)
Nellie Cournoyea, Northwest Territories, 1991–1995, (Consensus government)
Catherine Callbeck, Prince Edward Island, 1993–1996, (first elected female Premier) (Liberal)
Pat Duncan, Yukon, 2000–2002, (Liberal)
Eva Aariak, Nunavut, 2008–2013, (Consensus government)
Kathy Dunderdale, Newfoundland and Labrador, 2010–2014, (Progressive Conservative)
Alison Redford, Alberta, 2011–2014, (Progressive Conservative)
Pauline Marois, Quebec, 2012–2014, (Parti Québécois)
Kathleen Wynne, Ontario, 2013–2018, (Liberal)
Heather Stefanson, Manitoba, 2021–present, (Progressive Conservative)
(New Brunswick, Nova Scotia, and Saskatchewan have not yet had a female premier.)

First female deputy premier in:
British Columbia: Grace McCarthy
First female MLAs elected in British Columbia:
 Mary Ellen Smith, Liberal MLA 1918–1928, elected to replace her late husband
First female MLA elected in Alberta:
 Louise McKinney, she was also the first woman elected anywhere in the British Empire, 1917–1921 Alberta Legislature for the Non Partisan League, a left-wing Prohibitionist socialist party.
First female MLA elected in Saskatchewan:
 Sarah Ramsland, Saskatchewan Liberal, Pelly 1919 by-election, 1925. Replaced her husband Max who won the seat in 1917 general election after his death. Was re-elected in 1921 and defeated in 1925.
First female MLA elected in Manitoba:
 Edith McTavish Rogers, Manitoba Liberal MLA 1920–1932
First female MPPs elected in Ontario:
 Agnes Macphail and Rae Luckock, CCF (the forerunner to the New Democratic Party MPPs for York East 1943–1945, 1948–1951 and for Bracondale 1943–1945 respectively
First female MNA elected in Quebec:
 Marie-Claire Kirkland, elected in 1961. Also first woman appointed a cabinet minister in Quebec, the first woman appointed acting premier, and the first woman judge to serve in the Quebec Provincial Court.
First female MLA elected in New Brunswick:
 Brenda Robertson, New Brunswick Progressive Conservative MLA, 1967–1984
First female candidate in Prince Edward Island:
 Hilda Ramsay, Prince Edward Island CCF candidate in 1951
First female MLA elected in Prince Edward Island:
 Jean Canfield, Prince Edward Island Liberal MLA 1970–1979
First female MHA elected in Newfoundland and Labrador (pre-Confederation):
 Helena Squires, MHA 1930–1932
First female MLA elected in Nova Scotia:
 Gladys Porter, Nova Scotia Progressive Conservative MLA 1960–1967
First female MLA elected in Yukon:
 G. Jean Gordon, non-affiliated, MLA 1967–1970
First female MLA elected in Northwest Territories:
 Lena Pedersen (Pederson) in 1970 to 1975
First female MLA elected in Nunavut:
 Manitok Thompson, Independent, 1999–2003 (Nunavut was created from the Northwest Territories in 1999, so Thompson served in its first legislature.)
First female elected in a Nova Scotia municipal election:
 Mary Teresa Sullivan, Halifax City Council, 1936+
First female elected in an Ontario municipal election:
 Constance Hamilton, Toronto City Council, 1920–21
First female mayor, appointed:
 Violet Barss, Delia, Alberta (1920–1922)
First female mayor, elected:
 Barbara Hanley, Webbwood, Ontario (1936–1944)
First female mayor of a city:
 Charlotte Whitton, Ottawa (1951–1956, 1960–1964)
First female mayor of:
 Kentville, Nova Scotia: Gladys Porter (1946-1960)
 Ottawa, Ontario: Charlotte Whitton (1951–1956, 1960–1964)
 Prince Rupert, British Columbia: Nora Arnold (1947-1950)
 Edmonton, Alberta: Jan Reimer (1989-1995)
First female city councillor in:
Vancouver: Helena Gutteridge in 1937.
First female judge in
British Columbia: Helen Gregory MacGill in 1917
First female chief justice in:
British Columbia: Beverley McLachlin in 1988
Canada: Beverley McLachlin in 2000
Female presidents of major political parties
Agnes Macphail, Founding President of the Ontario CCF 1932–34
Gladys Strum, President of Saskatchewan CCF 1944-195?
First female Lieutenant Governors
 Pauline Mills McGibbon, 22nd Lieutenant-Governor of Ontario 1974–1980
 Pearl McGonigal, 19th Lieutenant-Governor of Manitoba 1981–1986
 Helen Hunley, 12th Lieutenant-Governor of Alberta 1985–1991
 Sylvia Fedoruk, 17th Lieutenant-Governor of Saskatchewan 1988–1994
 Marion Reid, 24th Lieutenant-Governor of Prince Edward Island 1990–1995
 Margaret McCain, 27th Lieutenant-Governor of New Brunswick 1994–1997
 Lise Thibault, 27th Lieutenant-Governor of Quebec 1997–2007
 Myra Freeman, 29th Lieutenant-Governor of Nova Scotia 2000–2006
 Iona Campagnolo, 27th Lieutenant-Governor of British Columbia 2001–2007
 Judy Foote, 14th Lieutenant-Governor of Newfoundland and Labrador, taking office in 2018
First female Commissioners of Canadian territories
 Ione Christensen, 10th Commissioner of Yukon 1979
 Helen Maksagak, 13th Commissioner of the Northwest Territories 1995–1999
 Helen Maksagak, 1st Commissioner of Nunavut 1999–2000

People with disabilities
First hearing-impaired (deaf) person elected in Canada:
 Gary Malkowski Ontario New Democratic Party MPP York East (East York) 1990–1995
First paraplegic person elected in Alberta:
 Percy Wickman Alberta Liberal Party MLA Edmonton-Whitemud (1989–1993), Edmonton-Rutherford (1993–2001)
First quadriplegic person elected to a Canadian legislature:
 Doug Mowat British Columbia Social Credit MLA Vancouver-Little Mountain 1983–1991
First quadriplegic person elected to the House of Commons:
 Steven Fletcher, Conservative, Charleswood—St. James, Manitoba, 2004–2015
First quadriplegic mayor :
 Sam Sullivan, Mayor of Vancouver, November 2005, December 2008
First legally blind person elected to the House of Commons:
 J. Trevor Morgan, Progressive Conservative, St. Catharines, Ontario, 1972–1974

Gay, lesbian, bisexual, transgender

First openly gay candidates in Canada
Peter Maloney, candidate for Toronto Board of Education in 1972, and for Toronto City Council in 1984, 1985 and 1988
Ian Maclennan, candidate for Ottawa Board of Education in 1976
Therese Faubert, League for Socialist Action candidate in Brampton in the 1977 Ontario provincial election
Frank Lowery, Ontario New Democratic Party candidate in Scarborough North in the 1977 Ontario provincial election
Dean Haynes, candidate for Toronto City Council in 1978; withdrawn before election day
Jim Monk, candidate for Windsor Board of Education in 1978
Robert Douglas Cook, Gay Alliance Toward Equality candidate in West Vancouver-Howe Sound in the 1979 British Columbia general election
George Hislop, candidate for Toronto City Council in 1980; independent candidate for St. George in the 1981 Ontario general election
First transgender-identified candidates
Jamie Lee Hamilton, 1996 Vancouver municipal election
Micheline Montreuil, 2008 federal election (nomination withdrawn before election)
Christin Milloy, 2011 Ontario provincial election, Ontario Libertarian Party candidate in Mississauga-Brampton South
Jennifer McCreath, 2015 federal election, Strength in Democracy candidate in Avalon
First transgender-identified officeholder
Municipal: Julie Lemieux, municipal councillor 2013-2017, later mayor 2017-present, of Très-Saint-Rédempteur, Quebec 
Provincial: Estefania Cortes-Vargas, Alberta MLA 2015–2019
First openly gay MP (male):
Svend Robinson, New Democratic MP for Burnaby—Douglas (1979–2004), came out publicly in 1988

First openly LGBT MP (female):
Libby Davies
First openly two-spirit MP:
Blake Desjarlais
First openly gay provincial premier (female):
Kathleen Wynne, Premier of Ontario (2013–2018)
First openly gay provincial premier (male):
Wade MacLauchlan, Premier of Prince Edward Island (2015–2019)
First openly gay members of provincial legislatures:
Maurice Richard, Quebec Liberal MNA for Nicolet (1985–89) and Nicolet-Yamaska (1989–94)
Ted Nebbeling, British Columbia Liberal MLA for West Vancouver-Garibaldi (1996–2005)
Tim Stevenson, British Columbia NDP MLA for Vancouver-Burrard (1996–2001)
George Smitherman, Ontario Liberal MPP for Toronto Centre (1999–2010)
Jim Rondeau, Manitoba NDP MLA for Assiniboia (1999–2016)
Gerry Rogers, Newfoundland and Labrador MHA for St. John's Centre (2011–2019)
Joanne Bernard, Nova Scotia MLA for Dartmouth North (2013–2017)
Michael Connolly and Ricardo Miranda, Alberta MLAs (2015–2019)
First gays/lesbians to run for leadership of a major party
Svend Robinson, 1995 New Democratic Party leadership election—came in first on first ballot, but withdrew
Scott Brison, 2003 Progressive Conservative leadership election—came in third
Scott Brison, 2006 Liberal Party of Canada leadership election
First openly gay leaders of political parties
Chris Lea, Green Party of Canada, 1990–1996
Allison Brewer, New Brunswick New Democratic Party, Sept 25, 2005–2006
André Boisclair, Parti Québécois, Nov 15, 2005–2007 (first openly gay leader of a party with seats in the legislature)
First openly gay/lesbian senators
Laurier LaPierre, Liberal
Nancy Ruth (formerly Nancy Jackman) PC, first lesbian senator, appointed in 2006, came out in 1990
First openly gay/lesbian cabinet ministers
Tim Stevenson, British Columbia, 2000–2001, first openly gay politician to be appointed to cabinet in Canada
André Boisclair, Quebec, 1996–2003, came out in 2000
Dale Eftoda, Yukon, 2000–2002, came out in 2001
Ted Nebbeling, British Columbia, 2001–2004
George Smitherman, Ontario, 2003–2009
Scott Brison, federal, 2004–2006
Jim Rondeau, Manitoba, 2004–2006
Kathleen Wynne, Ontario, 2006–2018
Jennifer Howard, Manitoba, (2009–2016)
Joanne Bernard, Nova Scotia, (2013–2017)
First openly gay mayor
Overall: Maurice Richard, Bécancour, Quebec
Major city: Glen Murray, Mayor of Winnipeg (1998–2004)
First openly gay city councillors:
 Montreal: Raymond Blain, 1986–1993
 Vancouver: Gordon Price, 1986–2002 (M); Ellen Woodsworth, 2002–2008 (F)
 Winnipeg: Glen Murray, 1989–1998
 Toronto: Kyle Rae, 1991–2010 (M); Kristyn Wong-Tam, 2010–2022 (F)
 Ottawa: Alex Munter, 1991–2003 (M); Catherine McKenney, 2014–2022 (F)
 Edmonton: Michael Phair, 1992–2007 (M); Sherry McKibben, 1994-1995 (F)
 Saskatoon: Lenore Swystun, 2000–2003 (F); Darren Hill, 2006-present (M)
 Halifax: Krista Snow, 2003–2008
 Red Deer: Paul Harris, 2010–2017
 Cumberland: Conner Copeman, 2011–present
 Wabana, Bell Island: Donovan Taplin, 2013–2017
 Hamilton: Aidan Johnson, 2014–2018
 Prince Albert: Evert Botha, 2016–2020

Indigenous people in Canada
Year that status Indians were granted the right to vote in federal elections: 1960. Year that status Indians were granted the right to vote in Quebec provincial elections: 1969

First Indigenous person elected to a legislature in Canada:
 Solomon White, Ontario Conservative Party, 1878-1886 and 1890-1894 (first Native elected anywhere in Canada)
First Indigenous person appointed to Canadian Senate (first Treaty Indian named a senator in Canada):
 James Gladstone of Alberta, 1958
First Indigenous person elected to the Canadian House of Commons (first Indigenous  MP):
 Leonard Marchand, Kamloops-Cariboo (British Columbia), Liberal Party, 1968–1979
First Indigenous  woman elected to the Parliament of Canada:
 Ethel Blondin-Andrew, Liberal Party of Canada, Western Arctic, 1988–2006
First Indigenous woman MLA elected in British Columbia:
 Melanie Mark, British Columbia New Democratic Party MLA for Vancouver-Mount Pleasant, 2016–Present
First Indigenous  MLA elected in Alberta:
 Mike Cardinal, Alberta Progressive Conservatives MLA Athabasca-Redwater 1989–2008
First Indigenous  MLA elected in Saskatchewan:
 Lawrence Riel Yew Saskatchewan New Democratic Party MLA Cumberland, 1982–1986 and second was Keith Goulet MLA, Cumberland, 1986–2003
First Indigenous woman MLA elected in Saskatchewan:
 Joan Beatty, Saskatchewan New Democratic Party MLA for Cumberland, 2003 to 2009
First Indigenous  MLA elected in Manitoba:
 Elijah Harper, Manitoba New Democratic Party MLA Rupertsland, 1981–1992
First Indigenous  MPP elected in Ontario:
 Solomon White, Ontario Conservative Party, 1878-1886 and 1890-1894
First Indigenous  MNA elected in Quebec:
 Ludger Bastien, Quebec Conservative Party MLA for Québec-Comté 1924–1927
First Indigenous  MLA elected in New Brunswick:
 T. J. Burke, NB Liberal MLA for Fredericton-Nashwaaksis 2006–2010
First Indigenous  MHA elected in Newfoundland and Labrador:
 Kevin Aylward Newfoundland and Labrador Liberal MHA St. George's-Stephenville East, 1985-2003
First Indigenous premier:
 Richard Nerysoo, Northwest Territories, 1984–1985 (consensus government)
First Indigenous speaker of a legislature:
 Richard Nerysoo, Northwest Territories, 1989–1991
First Indigenous leader of an official party in the Manitoba legislature:
 Wab Kinew, Manitoba New Democratic Party, 2017–Present
First Indigenous leader of an official party in the Newfoundland and Labrador legislature:
 Kevin Aylward, Liberal Party of Newfoundland and Labrador, 2011
First Métis elected to the House of Commons:
 Pierre Delorme, Conservative, MP Provencher, Manitoba 1871–1872
First Métis  MHA elected in Newfoundland and Labrador:
 Michael S. Martin, New Labrador, MHA Labrador South, 1972-1975
First Métis Leader of an official party in the Newfoundland and Labrador legislature:
 Yvonne Jones, Liberal Party of Newfoundland and Labrador, 2011
First Inuk elected to the Canadian House of Commons (first Inuit  MP):
 Peter Ittinuar, New Democratic Party, MP Nunatsiaq, NWT 1979–1984
First Inuk woman elected to the Canadian House of Commons (first female Inuit MP):
Nancy Karetak-Lindell, Liberal, MP Nunavut, 1997-2008
First Inuk legislator elected in Canada:
 Simonie Michael, member of the Northwest Territories Legislative Council, Eastern Arctic, 1966-1970
First Inuk MLA elected in Manitoba:
 George Hickes, Manitoba New Democratic Party MLA, Point Douglas, 1990–2011
First Inuk MHA elected in Newfoundland and Labrador:
 William Andersen III, Liberal MHA Torngat Mountains, 1993–1996
First Inuk Premier:
 Nellie Cournoyea, Northwest Territories, 1991–1995, (consensus government)
First Inuk speaker of a legislature:
 Levi Barnabas, Nunavut consensus government, Speaker 1999–2000
First Inuk appointed to the federal cabinet:
 Leona Aglukkaq, Conservative Party of Canada, Minister of Health, 2008.
First Indigenous person elected mayor in British Columbia:
 Allen Courtoreille, Chetwynd, British Columbia, October 20, 2018.

Acadians
First (Maritimes) Acadian MP: 
Auguste Renaud, MP for Kent (1867-1872)
First PEI Acadian MP:
Stanislaus Francis Perry, MP for Prince County (1874-1878)
First Nova Scotian Acadian MP: 
Vincent Pottier, MP for Shelburne—Yarmouth—Clare (1935-1945)
First Maritimes Acadian female MP: 
Pierrette Ringuette, MP for Madawaska—Victoria (1993-1997)

Arab Canadians
First Arab Canadian elected to the House of Commons (first Arab Canadian MP):
 Pierre de Bané, MP Matane, Quebec from 1968 to 1984 (Palestinian)
First female Arab Canadian elected to the House of Commons:
Maria Mourani, MP for Ahuntsic from 2006 to 2015 (Lebanese)
First Arab Canadian Premier:
 Joe Ghiz Prince Edward Island 1986 – 25 January 1993
First Arab Canadian in Cabinet
Pierre de Bané, Minister of Supply and Services 1978–1979 (Palestinian)
First Arab Canadian leaders of political parties
Fonse Faour, Newfoundland New Democratic Party leader, 1980–1981
Joe Ghiz, Prince Edward Island Liberal Party, 1981–1993
Hassan Husseini, Communist Party of Ontario, 1998–2001
Lorraine Michael, Newfoundland New Democratic Party leader 2006–2015
First Arab Canadian Senator:
 Mac Harb, Liberal Senator 2003-2013

Armenian Canadians
First Armenian Canadian elected to the House of Commons (first Armenian Canadian MP):
Sarkis Assadourian Liberal MP (Syrian Armenian), Don Valley North, 1993–1997 and Brampton Centre, 1997–2004

Black Canadians 

Earliest Black Canadians elected in Canada:
Wilson Ruffin Abbott, Elected to Toronto city council in 1840.
Abraham D. Shadd, Councillor of Raleigh Township (from 1858)
Abner Hunt Francis, Elected as councillor of Victoria in 1865, however, he resigned after being sworn in since he was not listed on the 1863 Assessment Role.
Mifflin Wistar Gibbs, Councillor of Victoria (1867–1869)
John Waters, Town Councilor, Town of Niagara (Niagara-on-the-Lake), 1874-1876, 1877-1880
James W. Douglas, Victoria City, British Columbia MLA, 1875–1878 (his paternal grandmother was part Black. As well, his mother was Cree.)
Burr Plato, town council member, Town of Niagara Falls (from 1886);
William Hubbard, City of Toronto city council member (from 1894) and a member of the Board of Control.  To this day, by virtue of his being on the citywide elected Board of Control, the only visible minority ever elected citywide across Toronto.
First Black candidate to run for the House of Commons:
 Bill White, Spadina, CCF (the forerunner to the New Democratic Party) 1949
First Black Canadian elected to the House of Commons:
 Rt. Hon Lincoln Alexander, Hamilton West, Progressive Conservative MP 1968–1984
First Black leader of a federal political party:
 Vivian Barbot, Interim leader of the Bloc Québécois, 2011
First Black leader of a provincial political party:
 Stuart Parker, Leader of the Green Party of British Columbia, 1993–2000
First Black candidate to run for the Ontario Legislature:
 Stanley G. Grizzle, York East, ran for the Ontario CCF (the forerunner to the Ontario New Democratic Party) in the 1959 provincial general election.
First Black Canadian elected to a Provincial Legislature in Canada:
 James W. Douglas, Victoria City, British Columbia MLA, 1875–1878
First Black woman elected to municipal council:
 Virnetta Anderson, City Councillor in Calgary from 1974-1977
First Black woman elected in Canada:
 Rosemary Brown Vancouver-Burrard, Burnaby-Edmonds, British Columbia New Democratic Party MLA 1972–1986

First Black woman elected to the House of Commons (first Black female MP)
Jean Augustine, Etobicoke—Lakeshore, Liberal MP, 1993–2006
First Black provincial legislator:
 Leonard Braithwaite, Etobicoke-York, Ontario Liberal MPP 1963–1975
First Black MLA in British Columbia:
 James W. Douglas, Victoria City, MLA 1875–1878
First Black female MLA in
Canada (and British Columbia): Rosemary Brown, Vancouver-Burrard, British Columbia New Democratic Party MLA 1972–1986
First Black MLA in Alberta:
 George Rogers, Alberta Progressive Conservative MLA Leduc-Beaumont-Devon 2004–2015
First Black MPP in Ontario:
 Leonard Braithwaite, Etobicoke-York, Ontario Liberal MPP 1963–1975
First Black female MPP in Ontario:
 Zanana Akande, St. Andrew—St. Patrick, Ontario New Democratic Party MPP 1990–1994

First Black MNA in Quebec:
 Jean Alfred, Papineau, Parti Québécois MNA 1976–1981
First Black Canadian and Female City Councillor in Montreal:
Kettly Beauregard, Marie-Victorin, Parti Vision Montreal, 1994–2001
First Black Canadian City Councillor in Fort Saskatchewan, Alberta:
Ajibola "Jibs" Abitoye, October 17, 2017
First Black Canadian and Female City Councillor in London, Ontario:
Arielle Kayabaga, October 22, 2018
First Black Female MNA in Quebec:
 Yolande James, Nelligan, Liberal MNA 2003–present
First Black MLA in Nova Scotia:
 Wayne Adams, Nova Scotia Liberal MLA for Preston 1993–1998
First Black female MLA in Nova Scotia:
 Yvonne Atwell, Nova Scotia New Democratic Party MLA for Preston 1998–1999
Black Speakers of Legislatures in Canada
Emery Barnes, British Columbia New Democratic Party MLA 1972–1996, Speaker in British Columbia Legislature 1993 to 1996 when he retired.
Alvin Curling, Ontario Liberal MPP 1985–2005, Speaker 2003–2005
First Black woman in Cabinet:
 Zanana Akande, St. Andrew—St. Patrick, Ontario New Democratic Party MPP 1990–1994
First Black Governor General of Canada:
 Michaëlle Jean Governor General of Canada, 2005–2010
First Black Lieutenant Governor:
 Rt. Hon Lincoln Alexander Lt. Governor of Ontario, 1985–1991
first black female candidate for a Canadian federal party leadership
Rosemary Brown in the 1975 New Democratic Party leadership election
First Black Senator:
 Anne Cools, Liberal Senator 1983–2004, Conservative, 2004+
First Black mayor:
 Firmin Monestime, 1964
First Black female mayor:
 Daurene Lewis, 1984

Chinese Canadians
First Chinese-Canadian candidate in Canada:
 Catherine Emily Ling, 1941 British Columbia provincial election for the Emancipation Party in Vancouver Point Grey
First Chinese-Canadian MP:
Douglas Jung (鄭天華|鄭天華), Progressive Conservative MP for Vancouver Centre (1957–1962), first Chinese Canadian to hold elected office
First Chinese-Canadian member of provincial legislature:
George Ho Lem (何榮禧), Alberta Social Credit MLA for Calgary-McCall (1971–75)
Bob Wong (黄景培), Ontario Liberal MPP for Fort York (1987–90)
Ida Chong (張杏芳), British Columbia Liberal MLA for Oak Bay-Gordon Head (1996–2013), together with Jenny Kwan were the first Chinese-Canadian women elected in Canada
Jenny Kwan (關慧貞|關慧貞), British Columbia NDP MLA for Vancouver-Mount Pleasant (1996–2015), together with Ida Chong were the first Chinese-Canadian women elected in Canada
First Taiwanese-Canadian MP:
Meili Faille, Bloc Québécois MP for Vaudreuil—Soulanges (2004-2011)

First Chinese-Canadian leader of a political party (federally or provincially)
 Arthur Lee (李僑棟), British Columbia Liberal leader, 1984–1987 (the British Columbia Liberals had no seats)
 Victor Lau, Saskatchewan Green Party Leader 2006 (interim), 2011–present
First Chinese-Canadian in Cabinet:
Bob Wong (黄景培), Ontario Liberal, Minister of Energy and Infrastructure (1987–89), Minister of Citizenship(1989–90)
Raymond Chan (陳卓愉|陳卓愉), Federal Liberal, Secretary of State (Asia-Pacific) (1993–2001), Minister of State (Multiculturalism)(2004–2006), First Chinese-Canadian federal cabinet minister
Gary Mar (馬健威), Alberta Progressive Conservative, Minister of International and Intergovernmental Relations, Minister of Health and Wellness, Minister of Learning, Minister of the Environment, and twice Minister of Community Development (1993–2007)
Jenny Kwan (關慧貞|關慧貞), British Columbia NDP, Minister of Municipal Affairs (1998–99), Minister of Women's Equality (1999–2000), Minister of Community Development, Cooperatives and Volunteers (2000–01)
Michael Chong (莊文浩|莊文浩), Federal Conservative, Minister of Intergovernmental Affairs and President of the Queen's Privy Council for Canada (2006)
Michael Chan, Ontario Liberal, Minister of Revenue (2007), Minister of Citizenship and Immigration (2007–2018)
Alice Wong (黃陳小萍|黃陳小萍), Federal Conservative, Minister of State for Seniors (2011–2021)
First Chinese-Canadian senator:
 Vivienne Poy (利德蕙|利德蕙), 1998-2012
First Chinese-Canadian governor general of Canada:
 Adrienne Clarkson (伍冰枝|伍冰枝), Governor General of Canada, 1999–2005
First Chinese-Canadian lieutenant governors
David Lam (林思齊|林思齊), British Columbia Lieutenant Governor 1988–1995
Norman Kwong (林佐民|林佐民), Lieutenant Governor of Alberta 2005–2010
Philip S. Lee (李紹麟|李紹麟), Lieutenant Governor of Manitoba
First Chinese-Canadian mayor in Canada:
Peter Wing (吳榮添), Mayor of Kamloops, first elected 1966, served for three terms

Croatian Canadians 
First Croatian Canadian elected to a Legislature:
 David Stupich, British Columbia MLA, Nanaimo and the Islands, 1963–1969, Nanaimo 1972–1988
First Croatian-born Canadian elected to a Legislature:
 John Sola, Ontario Liberal MPP, Missisauga East, 1987–1993 (expelled), Independent MPP 1993–1995
First Croatian Canadian elected to the House of Commons (first Croatian Canadian MP):
 David Stupich, New Democratic Party MP, Nanaimo—Cowichan, 1988–1993
First Croatian-born Canadian elected to the House of Commons:
 Janko Peric, Liberal MP, Cambridge, 1993–2004

Czech Canadians
First Czech Canadian MP:
 Otto Jelinek PC MP 1972–1979 High Park-Humber Valley, 1979–1993 Halton
First Czech Canadian cabinet minister:
 Otto Jelinek, 1984–1993

Dutch Canadians
First Dutch-born Canadians elected to the House of Commons:
Simon De Jong, NDP MP for Regina East, 1979–1997
John Oostrom, PC MP for Willowdale 1984–1988
Peter Stoffer, NDP MP for Sackville-Eastern Shore, 1997–2015
First Dutch-born Canadian Senator:
 Roméo Dallaire, 2005–2014
First Dutch-born Canadian Provincial Premier:
 Bill Vander Zalm, Social Credit Premier for British Columbia, 1986–1991

Filipino Canadians

First Filipino elected in Canada:
 Conrad Santos, Manitoba New Democratic Party MLA Burrows 1981–1988, Broadway 1990–1999, Wellington 1999–2007
First Filipino Canadian Woman elected in Canada:
 Flor Marcelino, Manitoba NDP MLA Wellington 2007–present
First Filipino Canadian elected to the House of Commons (first Filipino Canadian MP):
 Dr. Rey Pagtakhan, Winnipeg North, Liberal MP, 1988–2004
First Filipino Canadian elected in Manitoba:
 Conrad Santos, Manitoba New Democratic Party MLA Burrows 1981–1988, Broadway 1990–1999, Wellington 1999–present
First Filipino Canadian Woman elected in Manitoba:
 Flor Marcelino, Manitoba NDP MLA Wellington 2007–present
First Filipino Canadian appointed to the Federal Cabinet:
 Dr. Rey Pagtakhan, Secretary of State (Asia-Pacific) (2001–2002), Minister of Veterans Affairs (2002–2003), Secretary of State (Science, Research and Development) (2002–2003), Minister with political responsibility for Manitoba (2002–2003), Minister of Western Economic Diversification (2003–2004)
First Filipino Canadian to run for the leadership of a major party:
 Conrad Santos, Manitoba New Democratic Party leadership 1988

German Canadians
First German Canadian Prime Minister of Canada:
 John Diefenbaker, 1957–1963
First German Canadian Governor General of Canada:
 Edward Schreyer, 1979–1984
First German Canadian Provincial Premier:
 Edward Schreyer, Premier of Manitoba, 1969–1977

Greek Canadians
First Greek Canadian elected to the House of Commons (first Greek Canadian MP):
 Gus Mitges, Progressive Conservative MP, Grey—Simcoe 1972–1993
First Greek Canadian Senator:
 Philippe Gigantès, Liberal Senator appointed in 1984
First Greek elected to the Ontario legislature:
 George Samis, Ontario New Democratic Party MPP 1974 by-election, 1985, Cornwall
First Greek Minister in the Province of Nova Scotia:
 Labi Kousoulis, Nova Scotia Liberal Party MLA, 2013–present

Hungarian Canadians
First Hungarian Canadian elected to the House of Commons (first Hungarian Canadian MP):
 Tom Wappel, Liberal MP, Scarborough West 1988–2000; renamed Scarborough Southwest 2000–present
First Hungarian-born Canadian elected to the House of Commons:
 Andrew Telegdi, Liberal MP Waterloo, 1993–2008

Icelandic Canadians
First Icelandic-Canadian elected to a legislature in Canada:
 Sigtryggur Jonasson, Manitoba Liberal Party, 1896–1899, 1907–1910
First Icelandic-Canadian Provincial Party Leader:
 Boss Johnson, British Columbia Liberal Party, 1947–1952
First Icelandic-Canadian Premier:
 Boss Johnson, British Columbia Liberal Party, 1947–1952

Iranian Canadians
First Iranian Canadian elected to the Legislative Assembly of Ontario (1st Iranian Canadian Provincial MPP)
Reza Moridi, Liberal MPP, Richmond Hill, 2007–2018
First Iranian Canadian elected to the Canadian House of Commons (1st Iranian Canadian MPs)
Ali Ehsassi, Liberal MP, Willowdale, 2015–present
Majid Jowhari, Liberal MP, Richmond Hill, 2015–present
First Iranian Canadian elected to the Québec National Assembly (1st Iranian Canadian MNA)
Amir Khadir, Québec Solidaire MNA, Mercier, 2008–present. Also the first Iranian-Canadian co-spokesperson of a major provincial political party

Italian Canadians
First Italian Canadian to a provincial legislature
 Phil Gaglardi, 1952=1968, also first cabinet minister of Italian origin 1955 onwards
First Italian Canadian Elected to the House of Commons (1st Italian Canadian MP)
Hubert Badanai Liberal MP Fort William 1958–1972
First Italian Canadian Cabinet Minister (Federal)
Monique Bégin, 1976.09.14 Appointed Minister of National Revenue
First Italian Canadian Senator
Pietro Rizzuto, Liberal Senator appointed in 1976
First Italian Canadian to run for the leadership of a major party (federally or provincially):
John Nunziata, Federal Liberal Leadership race 1990
Phil Gaglardi, provincial British Columbia Social Credit League leadership race 1952
Tony Silipo, Ontario NDP leadership race 1996
Greg Sorbara, Ontario Liberal leadership race 1992
First Italian Canadian provincial party leader
Steven Del Duca, Ontario Liberal (2020-2022)

Japanese Canadians
First Japanese Canadian candidate in Canada:
 Joan Kabayama, Grenville—Carleton New Democratic Party 1972 federal election
First Japanese Canadian elected to the House of Commons (first Japanese Canadian MP):
 Bev Oda, Conservative MP, Clarington—Scugog—Uxbridge, 2004–2012
First Japanese Canadian elected to the Ontario Provincial Parliament (first Japanese Canadian MPP):
 David Tsubouchi, Progressive Conservative, Markham, 1995–2003
First Japanese Canadian elected to the British Columbia Legislature (first Japanese Canadian MLA):
 Naomi Yamamoto, BC Liberal Party, North Vancouver-Lonsdale, 2009-2017

Jewish Canadians

Extended full political rights:
 1831, in Lower Canada (Quebec)
First Jewish Canadian elected to a Legislature in Canada:
 Ezekiel Hart, elected in Lower Canada in the by-election of April 11, 1807
First Jewish Canadian cabinet minister (provincial or federal):
 David Croll, Ontario Liberal, Ontario Cabinet of Premier Mitchell Hepburn, 1934–1937
 Allan Grossman, Ontario Progressive Conservative, Ontario Cabinets of Premiers Leslie Frost, John Robarts and Bill Davis, 1960–1975
First Jewish Canadian federal cabinet minister:
 Herb Gray, Liberal, first appointed in 1969 as minister without portfolio by Pierre Trudeau (Liberal)

First Jewish Canadians elected to the Canadian House of Commons (first Jewish Canadian MP)
Henry Nathan Jr., Liberal MP Victoria 1872–1874
A. A. Heaps, CCF (the forerunner to the New Democratic Party) MP, Winnipeg North 1935–1940
Fred Rose, Labor-Progressive (Communist) MP Cartier, Quebec 1943–1947
First Jewish leader of a federal party:
 David Lewis, New Democratic Party 1971–1975
First Jewish Premiers
Dave Barrett, British Columbia New Democratic Party Premier 1972–1975
Tom Marshall, Newfoundland and Labrador Progressive Conservative Party, January 24, 2014 – September 26, 2014
First Jewish Senator:
 David Croll, Liberal, appointed 1955.
First Jewish Leaders of provincial parties
Dave Barrett, British Columbia New Democratic Party, 1969-May 20, 1984
Stephen Lewis, Ontario New Democratic Party, 1970–1978
Izzy Asper, Manitoba Liberal, 1970–75
Sidney Spivak, Manitoba Progressive Conservatives, 1971 to 1975
Stuart Smith, Ontario Liberal 1976–1982
Larry Grossman, Ontario Progressive Conservatives, November 22, 1985 - September 10, 1987
Tom Marshall interim, NL Progressive Conservative Party, January 24, 2014 - September 26, 2014
First Jewish Supreme Court Judge:
 Bora Laskin, 1970, subsequently Chief Justice
First Jewish mayors
 Lumley Franklin, Victoria, 1865–1866
 David Oppenheimer, Vancouver, 1888–1891
 David Croll, Windsor, 1931–1934
 Leonard Arthur Kitz, Halifax, 1955–1957
 Nathan Phillips, Toronto, 1955–1962
 Vernon Singer, North York (Reeve), 1957–1958
 Sidney Buckwold, Saskatoon, 1958–1963
 Max Silverman, Sudbury, 1966
 Sam Katz, Winnipeg, 2004–2014
 Stephen Mandel, Edmonton, 2004–2013
 Michael Applebaum, Montreal, 2012

Korean Canadians
First Korean Canadian candidates in Canada
Dr. David Kho, Ontario New Democratic Party, 1987 provincial election Scarborough—Agincourt
Raymond Cho, New Democratic Party, 1988 federal election, Scarborough—Rouge River
First Korean Canadian elected to Parliament: Nelly Shin, British Columbia
First Korean-Canadian elected to a legislature:
 Sandy Lee, Northwest Territories
First Korean-Canadian to hold federal public office:
 Yonah Martin (Kim), Conservative, Senator, 2009–present

Latvian Canadians
First Latvian Canadian MP:
 Sarmite Bulte, Liberal MP Parkdale—High Park, 1997–2006

Macedonian Canadians
First Macedonian Canadian MP
Lui Temelkovski, Liberal MP Oak Ridges-Markham 2004–2008

Maltese Canadians
First Maltese Canadian MP
Sue Barnes, Liberal MP London West 1993–2008

Muslim Canadians

First Canadian Muslim Cabinet Minister
 Maryam Monsef, Minister of Democratic Institutions since November 2015.
First Canadian Muslim Senator
 Mobina Jaffer, one of the six senators for British Columbia since 2001.
First Canadian Muslim MP
Rahim Jaffer, Reform MP for Edmonton Strathcona from 1997 till 2008.
First Female Canadian Muslim MP
Yasmin Ratansi, Liberal MP for Don Valley East from 2004 till 2011 and 2015
First Muslim MLA (Alberta) and Cabinet Minister
Larry Shaben, Alberta Progressive Conservative MLA for Lesser Slave Lake from 1975 till 1989. One of the first Muslims elected to higher political office in North America. Was the Minister of Utilities and Telephones from 1979 to 1982; the Minister of Housing (1982–1986) and Minister of Economic Development and Trade (1986–1989)
First Canadian Muslim MPP (Ontario)
 Khalil Ramal, Liberal MPP for London-Fanshawe from 2003 till 2011
 Shafiq Qaadri, Liberal MPP for Etobicoke North from 2003 till 2018
First Canadian Muslim president of a provincial political party
 Yasir Naqvi, President of the Ontario Liberal Party from 2009 - ?
First Canadian Muslim Mayor
 Naheed Nenshi, Mayor of Calgary since 2010.

Norwegian Canadians
First Norwegian elected to a legislature in Canada
 Hans Lars Helgesen, 1878–1886, Esquimalt, British Columbia MLA, first Scandinavian-Canadian member of a provincial legislature

Polish Canadians
First Polish Canadians elected to the House of Commons (first Polish Canadian MPs)
Alexandre-Édouard Kierzkowski, St. Hyacinthe, Quebec, Liberal MP, 1867–1872
Fred Rose, Labor-Progressive (Communist) MP 1943–1947, from Cartier, Quebec

Portuguese Canadians
First Portuguese Canadian elected to the House of Commons
John Rodriguez, Nickel Belt, New Democratic Party MP, 1974–1980, 1984–1993 (Guyanese Portuguese)

Russian Canadians
Russian Canadian leader of the opposition and leader of a major federal political party:
Michael Ignatieff, Liberal Party of Canada, 2008–2011

Slovak Canadians
First Slovak Canadian to run for the leadership of a major party:
 Peter Kormos, Ontario New Democratic Party leadership 1996

South Asian Canadians

Note: South Asians include those of Indian, Pakistani, Sri Lankan, Nepalese, or Bangladeshi ancestry.
First South Asian elected in Canada:
 Naranjan Grewall, City Councilor Mission, 1950 (Punjabi-Canadian)
 Naranjan Grewall, Mayor Mission, 1954
 Johnder Basran, Mayor Lillooet, early 1960s (Punjabi-Canadian)
First South Asian candidate in British Columbia:
 Naranjan Grewall, British Columbia, Dewdney, CCF Party of British Columbia, 1956 provincial election
First South Asian Canadian candidate in Canada:
 Hardial Bains, Marxist–Leninist Party of Canada, Eglinton, 1972 federal election
First South Asian Provincial Premier:
 Ujjal Dosanjh, British Columbia New Democratic Party, February 24, 2000 to June 5, 2001 (Punjabi-Canadian)
First South Asian Territorial Premier:
 Ranj Pillai, Yukon Liberal Party, January 28, 2023 – present (Malayali-Canadian)
First South Asian leaders of a major political party:
 Raj Pannu, Alberta New Democratic Party February 2, 2000 – 2004 (MLA 1997–2008) (Punjabi-Canadian)
Note: Hardial Bains was the first South Asian Canadian to lead a political party. He founded and led the Marxist–Leninist Party of Canada from 1970 to 1997

First South Asians elected to the House of Commons:
Gurbax Singh Malhi, Bramalea—Gore—Malton, Liberal MP 1993–2011 (Punjabi-Canadian)
Jag Bhaduria, Markham—Whitchurch—Stouffville, Liberal MP 1993–1997,
Herb Dhaliwal, Vancouver South, Liberal MP 1993–2003 (Punjabi-Canadian),
Hedy Fry, Vancouver Centre, Liberal MP 1993–present (Indo-Caribbean)
First South Asian elected in Official Opposition of Canada:
 Gurmant Grewal, M.P. Surrey Central 1997, as the Deputy Opposition House Leader was the First Indo-Canadian appointed the Officer of the House. He was also the first Chairman of a Joint Committee of the House and Senate for Scrutiny of Regulations in 1998.
First South Asian female MPs:
 Hedy Fry, Vancouver Centre, Liberal MP 1993+ (Indo-Caribbean)
First South Asian Sikh and Punjabi female MPs:
 Ruby Dhalla, Brampton—Springdale, Conservative MP 2004-2011 (Indo-Canadian)
 Nina Grewal, Fleetwood—Port Kells, Conservative MP 2004-2015 (Indo-Canadian)
First South Asian MLA elected in British Columbia:
 Moe Sihota, British Columbia New Democratic Party MLA, Esquimalt-Port Renfrew 1986–1991, Esquimalt-Metchosin, 1991–2001 (Punjabi-Canadian)

First South Asian MLA elected in Manitoba:
 Gulzar Singh Cheema, Manitoba Liberal MLA Kildonan 1988–1990 (Punjabi-Canadian)
First South Asian MPP elected in Ontario:
 Murad Velshi, Ontario Liberal MPP Don Mills 1987–1990
First South Asian MLA elected in Nova Scotia:
 Leonard Preyra, Nova Scotia NDP MLA Halifax Citadel 2006–2013
First South Asian School Board Trustee elected in Canada:
 Neethan Shan, York Region District School Board 2006–present
South Asian Canadian Senators
Mobina Jaffer, Liberal Senator, 2001–present
South Asian presidents, vice presidents and secretaries of political parties
Sav Dhaliwal, President of the British Columbia NDP (2009) (Punjabi-Canadian)
Raj Sharan, Former president of the Newfoundland and Labrador New Democratic Party

Tamil Canadians
First Tamil-Canadian candidate to run for the House of Commons:
Joseph Thevarkunnel, NDP candidate in 2000 federal election for Oak Ridges
First Tamil-Canadian candidate to run in Ontario
Chandran Mylvaganam, NDP Candidate in 1993 by-election in Don Mills
First Tamil-Canadian elected in Canada
Logan Kanapathi, elected Councillor for Ward 7 in Markham, Ontario in 2006 and one of the first two to be elected as MPP in 2018
Neethan Shan, elected York School Board Trustee for Markham Wards 7 and 8
First Tamil-Canadian Female elected in Canada
Juanita Nathan, elected York School Board Trustee for Markham Wards 7 and 8
First Tamil-Canadian and Tamil Female elected House of Commons
Rathika Sitsabaiesan, elected Member of Parliament for Scarborough-Rouge River, Ontario from 2011-2015

Ukrainian Canadians

First Ukrainian Canadian elected to a Legislature in Canada:
 Andrew Shandro, Alberta Liberal Party MLA from Whitford, Alberta, 1913–1922
First Ukrainian Canadian elected to the House of Commons (first Ukrainian Canadian MP):
 Michael Luchkovich, United Farmers/CCF MP from Vegreville, Alberta, 1926–1935
First Ukrainian Canadian Senator:
 William Michael Wall, Liberal Senator from Manitoba, 1955–1962
First Ukrainian Canadian cabinet minister:
 Michael Starr, federal Progressive Conservative, Minister of Labour, 1957–1963
First Ukrainian Canadian leader of a major political party:
 Roy Romanow, Saskatchewan New Democratic Party leader 1987–2001
First Ukrainian Canadian Premier:
 Roy Romanow, NDP Premier of Saskatchewan, 1990–2001
First Ukrainian Canadian Governor General of Canada:
 Ray Hnatyshyn, 1990–1995
First Ukrainian Canadian Mayor
 William Hawrelak 1951–1959, 1963–1965, 1974–1975
 Stephen Juba Winnipeg 1954–1977

Vietnamese Canadians

First Vietnamese Canadian elected to a Legislature in Canada:
 Hung Pham, Alberta Progressive Conservative MLA, Calgary-Montrose 1993–2008
First Vietnamese Canadian MP:
Ève-Mary Thaï Thi Lac, Bloc Québécois MP, Saint-Hyacinthe—Bagot 2007–2011
Hoang Mai, New Democratic Party MP, Brossard—La Prairie 2011–2015
Anne Minh-Thu Quach, New Democratic Party MP, Beauharnois—Salaberry 2011–2019
First Vietnamese Canadian Deputy Speaker of the Legislature in Canada:
 Wayne Cao

Elections 

 First election where a majority of women were able to vote: 1921 Canadian federal election
 First mail-in-only election: 2021 Newfoundland and Labrador general election

See also
 Women in Canadian politics
 List of visible minority politicians in Canada
 List of electoral firsts in New Zealand
 List of electoral firsts in the United Kingdom

References

External links
Still Counting : Women in Canadian Politics : List of Women of Diversity in Canadian Politics
Biographies of Canadian Women Politicians
Celebrating Women's Achievements", First of Women in Politics
Parliament of Canada, % of Women Candidates by Party
Legislature of Saskatchewan, Women in Politics in Saskatchewan
Parliament of Canada, List of current Members of Parliament born outside Canada
Parliament of Canada, List of past and present Members of Parliament born outside Canada
Parliament of Canada, List of current Members of the House of Commons of Inuit, Métis or First Nation Origin
Parliament of Canada, List of past & present Members of the House of Commons of Inuit, Métis or First Nation Origin
Gov. of Canada, Collections Canada; Contributions of Various Immigrant Communities to Canada
Gov. of Canada Collections Canada website; Biographies of Famous Black Canadians, including many Black Canadian Politicians
York University; Black Politicians in Canada

Ethnic groups in Canada
Political history of Canada
Lists of firsts
Canada politics-related lists
Lists of political office-holders in Canada